Money Means Nothing may refer to:

Money Means Nothing (1934 film), 1934 American drama film directed by Christy Cabanne
Money Means Nothing (1932 film), 1932 British comedy film directed by Herbert Wilcox